Aznvadzor is a town in the Lori Province of Armenia. The village was populated by Azerbaijanis prior to their exodus after the outbreak of the Nagorno-Karabakh conflict. In 1988-1989 Armenian refugees from Azerbaijan settled in the village.

Geography 
The village is located on the southern slopes of Bazum ridge in 4 km distance from the city of Vanadzor. It occupies with its areas 14.56 sq. km. The area is partially covered with forests.

Climate 
Yearly precipitation amounts to 600-700 mm.

Demography 

Before the outbreak of the Nagorno-Karabakh conflict the village was populated by Azerbaijanis who moved to Azerbaijan thereafter. In 1988-1989 Armenian refugees from Azerbaijan settled in the village.

Infrastructure 
The village has a school with a new building completed in the year 2003, a library and medical point. 

The postal code for the village is 2025.

Culture 
Recently an old Holy Mother of God Church serving the villages Aznvadzor and Bazum was renovated and consecrated.

Tourism 
Near the village there is a campsite called Aznvazor Eco Camp.

References

External links 

Populated places in Lori Province